Aspergillus discophorus is a species of fungus in the genus Aspergillus. It is from the Aenei section. The species was first described in 2008. It has been isolated from soil in Spain.

Growth and morphology

A. discophorus has been cultivated on both Czapek yeast extract agar (CYA) plates and Malt Extract Agar Oxoid® (MEAOX) plates. The growth morphology of the colonies can be seen in the pictures below.

References 

discophorus
Fungi described in 2008